Darzi (meaning "tailor") is a profession which is done by the people of different religions and communities of the world for their livelihood or as business in modern times. Talking about the old times, the tailoring business can be seen among the communities. In the Indian tradition, it was customary to wrap it over the body rather than wearing it. Nowadays wrap clothes tradition is limited, most of the people  prefer to wear stitched clothes. In Indian subcontinent, there is long history of caste (group of people with same profession which is not decided by birth, but by profession from the ancient era) division in the society. If we talk about the caste Darzi, they can be found in Hindus (Hindu Darzi) and Muslims (Idrisi) community of Uttar Pradesh are those Turkic Muslim tribes of the 13th century who were settled in Delhi and different states of India. who were soldiers in origin and later became related to this particular profession. The Darzi are a community of tailors, numbering around more than (as there is no caste census in India) 73,548,009 Many people are choosing Tailoring as a profession besides their ethnicity. According to the data of National Commission of Backward Classes, Darzi castes is enlisted in central and in every state caste lists of Other Backward Class (OBC) but Idrisi is enlisted in Uttar Pradesh state caste list.

Etymology
The Hindi-Urdu word Darzi (दर्ज़ी درزی) means tailor. It is derived from the Persian word darzan, which means "to sew".

History: India

Hindu Darzi 
The Hindu Darzi have various synonyms as well as legends about their community origins, the legends vary according to the Indian states in which they reside. In the North India, the Darzi community traces their descent from their legendary Hero Shri Peepa Ji Maharaj, who later became saint during Bhakti Movement in India who were the Pradeep|date=1928}}</ref> Swami Ramananda was a 14th-century Vaishnava devotional Poet, saint who lived in the Gangetic basin of Northern India. As the time passed due to many reasons people from this community shifted from their originating place to their place of work/Job to the other cities

Other clans of Hindu Darzi living in the different parts and states in India include Kakusth, Damodar Vanshi, Tank, Juna Gujrati, (these are living in Gujrat, Punjab, Haryana, Delhi NCR, Uttar Pradesh, Madhya Pradesh, Maharashtra, Chhattisgarh, Odisha and Karnataka). In Karnataka, the Darzi community is known as Pisse, Wade, Kakade and Sanyasi. In Odisha: Maharana, Mahapatra, which are also used as a surname.

Muslim Darzi 
Muslim Darzi claim descent from Idris (Enoch), one of the Biblical and Koranic prophets. According to their traditions, Prophet Hazrat Idris was the first person to learn the art of sewing. This is also the commonly accepted derivation of the name of the non-related religion Druze. The Darzi are said to have settled in South Asia during the early period of the Sultanate of Delhi. The Idrisi community of Uttar Pradesh are those Turkic Muslim tribes of the 13th century who were settled in Delhi and different states of India. They are also divided on a linguistic basis, with those of North India speaking various dialects of Urdu, while those of Punjab speaking Punjabi. The Punjabi Darzi are said to be converted from the Hindu Chhimba caste, and have several territorial divisions. These include the Sirhindi, Deswal and Multani. In the present-day, the Punjabi Darzi (Chhimba Darzi) are almost entirely Sunni.

In Uttar Pradesh state of India, Muslim Darzi are also called as Khayyat and have recently begun affixing the title Idrisi, thereby tracing their origin to Idrish. They believed that he was the real teacher from whom their forefathers learned the art of tailoring. According to their traditions, Idris had learned the art of sewing. This is also the commonly accepted derivation of the name of the non-related religion Druze.

During the Mughal period, some units of Mughal soldiers who were Ilbari Turks used to protect the borders of Delhi. In the beginning of the 18th century, the weakening army of the Mughals and the increasing rebellions and internal wars of the Jaats and Sikhs took away the power of the Mughal forces and these soldiers left their areas around Delhi to Awadh. There were more in which children and women were also included. This was the first military exodus from Delhi to Awadh in the early 18th century. These military families were settled in Ismailganj village by the Nawab of Awadh. A few decades later in the war of 1857, these Ilbari soldiers fought with British power at a place called Chinhat, where there was a caravan saraaen and in the village of Ismailganj, Ilbari and Sayyad were victorious. and caused heavy loss of life and property to the British Cantonment in which the British lived along with their families. After the end of the revolution, the revolutionaries were searched and action was taken against them, the houses were demolished and the Ilbari and Sayyid revolutionaries were hanged on the trees and their dead bodies were left hanging on the trees.

The jagirs of Sayyad's were confiscated and the Ilbaris had to leave the village and take refuge in other areas like Barabanki, Satrikh, Kanpur, Faizabad, Rudauli and other areas, due to the brutality and barbarism of the British soldiers, they had to change their hideouts again and again, but due to the rebels, the British They could not get any help, permanent shelter from the zamindars. Due to which he had to change his surname from Ilbari to Idrisi to hide his identity. Therefore, later some regional zamindars were given shelter in their areas to save their rapidly deteriorating economic condition.

The Idrisi of Jharkhand have a common origin with those of Bihar, and intermarry. The community speak the Angika dialect of Hindi. Most Idrisis are still engaged in tailoring, but many Idrisis, particularly in Jharkhand are now farmers. Their customs are similar to other Bihari Muslims.

History: Pakistan
In Pakistan, the Darzi are two distinct communities, the Delhiwal Idrissis, who are found among the Muhajir ethnic group, and the Chhimba Darzi, who are ethnically Punjabi. The former are immigrants from Delhi and Uttar Pradesh in India. They are concentrated in the port city of Karachi. Like their North Indian kinsmen, many have now opened small shops and businesses, although many other members of the community work for other Idrissis. They remain divided by sectarian divisions, the Sunni Idrisi not marrying into Shia Idrisi families. The community claims itself to be of Shaikh status.

In Punjab, the Chhimba Darzi are immigrants from East Punjab. Many in rural areas of Punjab have taken to cultivation, while those in urban areas have opened up small businesses. The Chhimba Darzi claim to .They are entirely Sunni, and many belong to the orthodox Deobandi sect.

See also
 Druze heterodox Muslim community of Syria, also derived their name from the word Darzi.

References

Muslim communities of Bihar
Muslim communities of India
Muslim communities of Uttar Pradesh
Punjabi tribes
Social groups of Pakistan
Social groups of Uttar Pradesh
Social groups of Bihar